Thingalnagar is the town panchayat, located in Kanniyakumari district in the Indian state of Tamil Nadu.

The origin of the name "Thingalnagar" ("Monday Market" in English) is that every Monday, people from several nearby villages, wholesalers, and farmers for trading gather at the market. Markets can be found in Thingalnagar selling fresh marine fish, vegetables, and pets.

Demographics
As of the 2001 Census of India, Thingalnagar has a population of 12,554. Males constitute 49% of the population, and females 51%. Thingalnagar has an average literacy rate of 78%, higher than the national average of 59.5%; male literacy is 81%, and female literacy is 76%. In Thingalnagar, 10% of the population is under 6 years of age.

Education
 Nursing College, Neyyoor
 CSI Medical College, Neyyoor
 Government Higher Secondary School, Eraniel
 Government Girls High School, Eraniel
 L.M.S. Girls Higher Secondary School
 St. Francis Xavier Primary & Higher Secondary School, Mankuzhy

References

Cities and towns in Kanyakumari district